Stav Elimelech (born 9 November 1969) is an Israeli former professional footballer that has played in Hapoel Be'er Sheva.

Honours

Club
 Hapoel Beer Sheva

 Premier League:
 Third place (4):1987/1988, 1993/1994, 1994/1995, 1996/1997
 State Cup:
 Winners (1): 1996/1997
 Runners-up (1): 2002/2003
 Toto Cup:
 Winners (2): 1988/1989, 1995/1996
 Lillian Cup:
 Winners (1): 1988
 Second League:
 Winners (1): 1999/2000

References

External links

1969 births
Living people
Israeli Jews
Israeli footballers
Association football midfielders
Hapoel Be'er Sheva F.C. players
Bnei Yehuda Tel Aviv F.C. players
Israel international footballers
Liga Leumit players
Israeli Premier League players
Footballers from Beersheba
Israeli football managers